Orazio Maurice Fantasia (  or  ; born 14 September 1995) is a professional Australian rules footballer playing for Port Adelaide Football Club in the Australian Football League (AFL). He was recruited by the Essendon Football Club with the 55th overall selection in the 2013 national draft.

AFL career 
Fantasia graduated from Norwood Morialta High School in 2013. Fantasia played his junior football for the Payneham Norwood Union Football Club where his talent was identified by South Australian Hall of Famer Garry McIntosh who selected him in the club's senior side as a 15 year old. He made his senior debut for Norwood in the South Australian National Football League (SANFL) in 2013. In only his fourth game he was a member of their 2013 SANFL premiership side.

Fantasia received a second nomination for the Rising Star after his three goals, eleven disposals, seven contested possessions, and seven tackles in round 17, 2016.

In August 2018, Fantasia signed a three-year deal, keeping him at Essendon until the end of the 2021 season.

In August 2020, Fantasia again showed an interest in returning to South Australia, with a possible move to the Port Adelaide Football Club. He eventually got his wish, and was traded to Port Adelaide on the final day of the trade period.

Statistics 
Statistics are correct to the end of Round 9 2022 

|- style="background-color: #EAEAEA"
| 2014 ||  || 46 || 3 || 0 || 2 || 9 || 17 || 26 || 8 || 1 || 0.0 || 0.7 || 3.0 || 5.7 || 8.7 || 2.7 || 0.3
|- class="sortbottom"
| 2015 ||  || 46 || 5 || 2 || 0 || 41 || 40 || 81 || 16 || 18 || 0.4 || 0.0 || 8.2 || 8.0 || 16.2 || 3.2 || 3.6
|- style="background-color: #EAEAEA"
| 2016 ||  || 13 || 19 || 29 || 25 || 146 || 136 || 282 || 75 || 72 || 1.5 || 1.3 || 7.7 || 7.2 || 14.8 || 4.0 || 3.8
|- class="sortbottom"
| 2017 ||  || 13 || 20 || 39 || 22 || 161 || 114 || 275 || 74 || 53 || 2.0 || 1.1 || 8.1 || 5.7 || 13.8 || 3.7 || 2.7
|- class="sortbottom"
|- style="background-color: #EAEAEA"
| 2018 ||  || 13 || 13 || 20 || 16 || 109 || 92 || 201 || 54 || 64 || 1.5 || 1.2 || 8.4 || 7.1 || 15.5 || 4.2 || 4.9
|- class="sortbottom"
| 2019 ||  || 13 || 15 || 20 || 12 || 101 || 72 || 173 || 46 || 32 || 1.3 || 0.8 || 6.7 || 4.8 || 11.5 || 3.1 || 2.1
|- style="background-color: #EAEAEA"
|- class="sortbottom"
| 2020 ||  || 13 || 5 || 1 || 0 || 27 || 22 || 49 || 15 || 6 || 0.2 || 0.0 || 5.4 || 4.4 || 9.8 || 3.0 || 1.2
|- class="sortbottom"
| 2021 ||  || 13 || 15 || 28 || 23 || 126 || 52 || 178 || 48 || 30 || 1.8 || 1.5 || 8.4 || 3.4 || 11.8 || 3.2 || 2.0
|- style="background-color: #EAEAEA"
|- class="sortbottom"
| 2022 ||  || 13 || 1 || 0 || 0 || 0 || 0 || 0 || 0 || 0 || 0.0 || 0.0 || 0.0 || 0.0 || 0.0 || 0.0 || 0.0
|- style="background-color: #EAEAEA"
|- class="sortbottom"
! colspan=3| Career
! 96
! 139
! 100
! 720
! 545
! 1265
! 336
! 276
! 1.4
! 1.0
! 7.5
! 5.6
! 13.1
! 3.5
! 2.8
|}

References

Footnotes

External links 

1995 births
Living people
Essendon Football Club players
Norwood Football Club players
Australian rules footballers from Adelaide
Australian people of Italian descent
Port Adelaide Football Club players